Major-General The Honourable Sir Frederick Gordon,  (9 October 1861 – 18 October 1927) was a senior British Army officer, who additionally served as a major general in the early Royal Air Force.

Early life and education
Gordon was born on 9 October 1861 to Edward Gordon, Baron Gordon of Drumearn, a law lord and Conservative politician. He attended Highgate School and Wellington College, Berkshire and then, as a gentleman cadet, he attended the Royal Military College, Sandhurst to undergo officer training.

Military career
On 22 January 1881, Gordon was commissioned into the British Army as a second lieutenant. During 1881, he served as an officer in the 91st (Argyllshire Highlanders) Regiment of Foot, the Princess Charlotte of Wales's (Royal Berkshire Regiment), the Berkshire Regiment, and the Gordon Highlanders. This was the year of the Childers Reforms which caused turmoil in some areas of the British Army with its disbandment and amalgamation of some infantry regiments. During his early career he served abroad with the Gordon Highlanders: he saw service in Egypt (1882–1885), fighting at the Battle of Tell El Kebir, Second Battle of El Teb and Battle of Tamai; in Sudan (1889) at the Battle of Toski; and in South Africa (1899–1902) during the Second Boer War. For his service in the latter war, he received the brevet rank of lieutenant-colonel on 22 August 1902.

On 9 January 1908, Gordon was promoted to the substantive rank of lieutenant-colonel.  From 1908 to 1911, he was Commanding Officer of the 1st Battalion, Gordon Highlanders. On 10 August 1911, he was made a general staff officer, 1st class.

Gordon served during the First World War in Europe. He became General Officer Commanding 22nd Division in June 1915 and saw action on the Macedonian front. On 1 April 1918, he was granted a temporary commission in the newly created Royal Air Force as a major-general.

Gordon retired from the military in 1920 on retired pay. He died on 18 October 1927, aged 66.

Honours
Gordon was awarded the Egypt Medal with three clasps and the Khedive's Star for his service in Egypt and Sudan in the 1880s. He was awarded the Queen's South Africa Medal with six clasps, the King's South Africa Medal with both clasps, and was mentioned in despatches four times for his service during the Second Boer War. On 29 November 1900, he was appointed a Companion of the Distinguished Service Order (DSO) "in recognition of the services [...] in connection with the Campaign in South Africa, 1899-1900".

Gordon received a number of honours for his service during the First World War. On 15 February 1915, he was appointed a Companion of the Order of the Bath (CB) "in recognition of the meritorious services [...] during the war". In February 1916, he was awarded the Order of the White Eagle, 2nd Class (with Swords) by the King of Serbia. In the 1917 King's Birthday Honours, he was promoted to Knight Commander of the Order of the Bath (KCB) "for valuable services rendered in connection with Military Operations in the Field", and thereby granted the title sir. He was also mentioned in despatches five times during the War.

Personal life
In 1897, Gordon married Mabel Rose Robinson. Together they had three children; one son and two daughters.

References

Bibliography

1861 births
1927 deaths
People educated at Highgate School
People educated at Wellington College, Berkshire
Gordon Highlanders officers
British Army generals of World War I
Royal Air Force generals of World War I
Knights Commander of the Order of the Bath
Companions of the Distinguished Service Order
Graduates of the Royal Military College, Sandhurst
Sons of life peers
British Army personnel of the Second Boer War
British Army personnel of the Anglo-Egyptian War
British Army personnel of the Mahdist War
British Army major generals